Playa de La Alcaidesa is a beach in the municipality of La Línea de la Concepción, in the Province of Cádiz, Andalusia, Spain. It i s a busy beach north of the city and bounded on the south by the Playa de La Hacienda and north by Punta Mala, and in the municipality of San Roque. It contain toilets, showers and has daily collection of waste during the bathing season. The beach is accessed from the nearby urbanization of La Alcaidesa.

References

La Línea de la Concepción
Beaches of Andalusia